Margaret Bryan may refer to:

Margaret Bryan (c. 1468–c. 1551/52), Lady Governess to Henry VIII's children
Margaret Bryan (philosopher) ( 1815), British natural philosopher and educator
Margaret Bryan (diplomat) (born 1929), British ambassador
Peggy Bryan (Margaret Eileen Bryan, 1916–1996), English actress